Keith Crossan  (born 29 December 1959 in Belfast, Northern Ireland) is a former Irish rugby union international player who played for the Irish national rugby union team. He played as a winger.
He played for the Ireland team from 1982 to 1992, winning 41 caps and scoring 12 tries including 2 against Canada at the 1987 Rugby World Cup.
He played in two Rugby World Cups: 1987 and 1991. He also played for the Barbarians against Argentina in 1990, scoring two tries.

References

External links

1959 births
Living people
Irish rugby union players
Ireland international rugby union players
Ulster Rugby players
Instonians rugby union players
Rugby union players from Belfast
Rugby union wings